Przemysław Tytoń (born 4 January 1987) is a Polish professional footballer who plays as a goalkeeper for Eredivisie club Twente.

Club career 
Born in Zamość, Tytoń played for Górnik Łęczna until the end of the 2006–07 season when the Polish first-league club was relegated to the third division because of corruption. His application to be released from his contract was granted by the PZPN, following which he signed a five-year contract with Roda JC.

Roda JC 
His Eredivisie debut came on 29 March 2008 in a goalless draw against Heracles Almelo. However, he did not make any appearances the following season.

In January 2010, Tytoń became the club's first choice goalkeeper, taking over from Bram Castro. He had shoulder surgery at the end of March 2011.

After 2010–11 Eredivisie season, Tytoń was listed as the second best goalkeeper, only behind Maarten Stekelenburg. He had an offer from Belgian champion KRC Genk, but did not accept it.

PSV 
On 16 August 2011, it was announced that PSV Eindhoven had taken Tytoń on a one-year loan, with an option to buy at the end of the season. On 20 January 2012, it was announced that PSV has signed Tytoń for an extra four years.

On 18 September 2011, Tytoń suffered a serious concussion when he collided with a teammate during the match between PSV and Ajax and was subsequently carried out on a stretcher, with the game delayed for 15 minutes. There was no serious damage so he was discharged from hospital the next day. In the Europa League match against FC Rapid București (2–1) Tyton was back in goal for PSV.

Tytoń rapidly gained a strong form in goal for PSV after his injury and replaced former first choice goalkeeper Andreas Isaksson by the time Phillip Cocu had been announced as caretaker manager after Fred Rutten in March 2012. Among many strong matches, he especially displayed his talent in the 2011–12 KNVB Beker semi final against SC Heerenveen where PSV advanced to the final on a 3–1 victory. Tytoń at times almost single-handedly kept the opposition from producing a comeback and saved a penalty from the 2011-12 Eredivisie topscorer Bas Dost. He subsequently became known as the "penalty killer" among media and fans.

He featured in the KNVB Beker final on 8 April 2012, where PSV beat Heracles Almelo 3–0.

At the start of the 2012–13 season, Tytoń received the number 1 shirt at PSV after the departure of Isaksson. He began the season as the first choice goalkeeper, ahead of the new signing Boy Waterman. However, after five league games, Tytoń was demoted to the bench as Waterman was preferred as the first choice goalkeeper by the new manager Dick Advocaat.

Elche (loan) 
On 4 July 2014, Tytoń joined La Liga side Elche on a one-year loan deal. He began the season as a starter on matchday one against Barcelona at the Camp Nou, in which he conceded three goals. However, after four games, he lost his starting spot to Manu Herrera. Despite this, a month later and due to an injury to Herrera, Tytoń regained his position, putting in decisive performances. At the end of the season, Elche avoided relegation and Tytoń made 35 total appearances.

VfB Stuttgart 
For the 2015–16 season Tytoń moved to VfB Stuttgart. He made his Bundesliga debut on 16 August 2015 – the first matchday of the domestic season – in a 3–1 defeat at home to 1. FC Köln. After a 6–2 away loss to Werder Bremen on towards the end of the season, Tytoń was replaced in goal in the final two games of the season by Mitchell Langerak, who had been sidelined with an injury since pre-season.

Deportivo La Coruña 
On 30 June 2016, Tytoń signed a three-year deal with Deportivo de La Coruña, returning to Spain one year after leaving Elche. He started the season as a backup to Germán Lux, but due to the team's poor defensive performances, Tytoń took over as the starter on 31 October in a 1–1 draw against Valencia. The club finished in 16th place; clear of relegation, and Tytoń made 13 total appearances during the season, losing his starting spot to Lux again after poor displays against Barcelona (4–0) and Celta (4–1).

FC Cincinnati
On 13 December 2018, Tytoń joined Major League Soccer club FC Cincinnati ahead of their inaugural 2019 season. He made his debut for the club on 2 March 2019 in FC Cincinnati's first match against the Seattle Sounders FC which they lost 4–1. After the match, Tytoń sustained a hamstring injury which kept him until April, with backup goalkeeper Spencer Richey starting in the meantime. Throughout the season, Tytoń competed with Richey for the starting spot, appearing in 15 matches. 

Following the 2021 season, Cincinnati declined their contract option on Tytoń.

Ajax
On 7 March 2022, Tytoń returned to the Eredivisie to play for AFC Ajax who were in desperate need of a goalkeeper after injuries of Maarten Stekelenburg, Remko Pasveer and Jay Gorter.

Twente
On 23 May 2022, Tytoń moved to Twente on a two-year contract, with the option of an additional year. The move reunited him with his former FC Cincinnati head coach Ron Jans.

International career 

On 29 May 2010, he debuted for the Poland national team in a 0–0 draw against Finland.

On 11 August 2010, he played in the second half against Cameroon. He conceded two goals.

Tytoń was selected in Poland's squad for UEFA Euro 2012 as a second choice goalkeeper behind Wojciech Szczęsny after Łukasz Fabiański was ruled out for the competition due to injury. 
On the 68th minute in the opening match against Greece, Szczęsny was given a straight red card after giving away a penalty. Tytoń came on as a substitute to replace Maciej Rybus and saved the penalty taken by Greek captain Giorgos Karagounis. The game ended in a 1–1 draw.
He became the first goalkeeper in history of the European Championships to save a penalty after coming on. After the match, Tytoń said saving the penalty was "like a dream": “It felt like a dream, I was aware that now was my chance. I really wanted to help the team. Thank God I saved the penalty.”
Tytoń continued on as Poland's starting goalkeeper for the next two matches, even beyond Szczęsny's return from the red card suspension.

Career statistics

Club

International

Honours
PSV
 KNVB Cup: 2011–12
 Johan Cruyff Shield: 2012

Ajax
 Eredivisie: 2021–22

References

External links 
 Voetbal International profile 
 
 

1987 births
Living people
People from Zamość
Sportspeople from Lublin Voivodeship
Polish footballers
Association football goalkeepers
Poland international footballers
Poland youth international footballers
Poland under-21 international footballers
UEFA Euro 2012 players
Ekstraklasa players
Eredivisie players
Eerste Divisie players
Major League Soccer players
La Liga players
Bundesliga players
Górnik Łęczna players
Roda JC Kerkrade players
PSV Eindhoven players
Jong PSV players
Elche CF players
VfB Stuttgart players
Deportivo de La Coruña players
FC Cincinnati players
AFC Ajax players
FC Twente players
Polish expatriate footballers
Expatriate footballers in the Netherlands
Polish expatriate sportspeople in the Netherlands
Expatriate footballers in Spain
Polish expatriate sportspeople in Spain
Expatriate footballers in Germany
Polish expatriate sportspeople in Germany
Expatriate soccer players in the United States
Polish expatriate sportspeople in the United States